Siah Darreh 2 (also Romanized as Sīāh Darreh 2) is a village in Teshkan Rural District, Chegeni District, Dowreh County, Lorestan Province, Iran. At the 2006 census, its population was 48, in 10 families.

References 

Towns and villages in Dowreh County